Bath County is an extinct county formerly located in the British American colony of North Carolina. The county was established in 1696 and was abolished in 1739. The original three precincts of Bath County—Pamplicough, Wyckham and Archdale—were renamed in 1712 and became Beaufort, Hyde, and Craven counties when Bath County split in 1738.

The town of Bath (still in existence as NC's oldest town) was a stopping place of Edward Teach, better known as the pirate Blackbeard. He is said to have married a local girl and briefly settled in the harbor town of Bath around 1716.

See also
 List of former United States counties
 List of North Carolina counties

References

External links

 Bath County North Carolina Genealogy at ncroots.com
 Bath County North Carolina Genealogy at USGenNet (usgennet.org)

1696 establishments in North Carolina
Former counties of North Carolina
Pre-statehood history of North Carolina